High Head Castle is a large fortified manor house in the English county of Cumbria. It is located between Carlisle and Penrith. The house is now largely a ruin with the exterior walls and certain foundations surviving for the majority of the building. The right hand wing of the building has had a roof re-instated, and may be usable again for the first time since the building burnt down in the 1950s. It is currently not open to the public. It is privately owned, and the owners have now for some time been trying to restore it to its former glory.

History
The site was originally occupied by the Kings Castle in the Forest of Inglewood. The earliest written record is of the original castle is from 1272. This castle was a medieval square pele tower within a curtain wall.

The first known occupants of the house were the Richmond family, who bought and extended the house in the 16th century. Only its western wing remains, with its unmistakable straight-headed mullioned windows with round-arched lights under hood moulds, although attached to the south-west corner of this wing is the basement of a square tower which presents evidence of 14th-century work.

The house was later sold to the Baron Brougham and Vaux who made some alterations. One member of the family, Henry Richmond Brougham, had a new facade built in 1744–1748. It is eleven bays long, with a pedimented three-bay centre, and a walled front garden with coupled Ionic columns. When the Broughams no longer required the house, they rented it out for some time. By the mid-19th century, and until at least 1909, it was occupied by the Hills family, and was the childhood home of the soldier and astronomer Edmond Hills. The only other people known to have rented it were the Cavaghan family (co-founders of Cavaghan & Gray), who lived in the house for around eight years, from 1921 to 1929.

The castle was largely destroyed by fire in 1956, and is now little more than a shell.  Both the medieval wing and the principal house are Grade II listed. Adjacent is a fine stable quadrangle with heavy rustication, a steep pediment gable and cupola.

See also

Grade II* listed buildings in Eden District
Listed buildings in Skelton, Cumbria

External links

 Article on the Institute of Historic Building Conservation site

Country houses in Cumbria
Castles in Cumbria
Ruins in Cumbria
Grade II* listed buildings in Cumbria
British country houses destroyed in the 20th century
Inglewood Forest
Skelton, Cumbria